Lactarius cilicioides is a member of the large milk-cap genus Lactarius in the order Russulales.

See also
List of Lactarius species

References

External links

cilicioides
Fungi described in 1821
Fungi of Europe
Taxa named by Elias Magnus Fries